Mahalia is a given name and may refer to:

Mahalia Barnes (born 1982), Australian singer-songwriter
Mahalia Belo, British film and television director
Mahalia (singer) (born 1 May 1998), English singer, songwriter and actress, better known by the stage name Mahalia 
Mahalia Cassidy (born 1995), Australian netball player
Mahalia Jackson (1911–1972), American gospel singer